The 2021–22 Macedonian Second Football League was the 30th season of the Macedonian Second Football League, the second division in the Macedonian football league system. The season began on 25 August 2021 and concluded on 14 May 2022.

East

Participating teams

League table

Results

Matches 1–18

Matches 19–27

Top scorers

West

Participating teams

League table

Results

Matches 1–18

Matches 19–27

Top scorers

See also
2021–22 Macedonian Football Cup
2021–22 Macedonian First Football League

References

External links
Football Federation of Macedonia 
MacedonianFootball.com 

North Macedonia 2
2
Macedonian Second Football League seasons